Portsmouth Courthouse, also known as Norfolk County Courthouse, is a historic courthouse building located at Portsmouth, Virginia, United States. It was built in 1846, and is a one-story with basement, Greek Revival style brick building.  It measures 78 feet wide by 57 feet deep.  The building is topped by a paneled parapet with Doric order entablature supported by plain Greek Doric pilasters.  The building remained in use as a courthouse until 1960, when the county government moved to Great Bridge.

It was listed on the National Register of Historic Places in 1970. It is located in the Downtown Portsmouth Historic District.

The building now houses the Portsmouth Art & Cultural Center.

References

Courthouses on the National Register of Historic Places in Virginia
Greek Revival architecture in Virginia
Government buildings completed in 1846
Buildings and structures in Portsmouth, Virginia
County courthouses in Virginia
National Register of Historic Places in Portsmouth, Virginia
Individually listed contributing properties to historic districts on the National Register in Virginia
1846 establishments in Virginia